Amber Valley is a constituency in Derbyshire, represented in the House of Commons of the UK Parliament since 2010 by Nigel Mills, a Conservative.

History
The constituency was created in 1983, and was held by Phillip Oppenheim of the Conservative Party from its creation until Judy Mallaber of the Labour Party won the seat in 1997. She was narrowly defeated in 2010 by Nigel Mills, a Conservative, who increased his majority in 2015 and 2017.

Boundaries

1983–1997: The District of Amber Valley wards of Aldercar, Alfreton East, Alfreton West, Codnor, Denby and Horsley Woodhouse, Heage and Ambergate, Heanor and Loscoe, Heanor East, Heanor West, Holbrook and Horsley, Kilburn, Riddings, Ripley, Ripley and Marehay, Shipley Park, Somercotes, Swanwick, and Wingfield, and the Borough of Erewash wards of Breadsall and Morley, Little Eaton, and Stanley.

1997–2010: The Borough of Amber Valley wards of Aldercar, Alfreton East, Alfreton West, Codnor, Crich, Denby and Horsley Woodhouse, Heage and Ambergate, Heanor and Loscoe, Heanor East, Heanor West, Holbrook and Horsley, Kilburn, Riddings, Ripley, Ripley and Marehay, Shipley Park, Somercotes, Swanwick, and Wingfield, and the Borough of Erewash wards of Breadsall and Morley, Little Eaton, and Stanley.

2010–present: The Borough of Amber Valley wards of Alfreton, Codnor and Waingroves, Heage and Ambergate, Heanor and Loscoe, Heanor East, Heanor West, Ironville and Riddings, Kilburn, Denby and Holbrook, Langley Mill and Aldercar, Ripley, Ripley and Marehay, Shipley Park, Horsley and Horsley Woodhouse, Somercotes, Swanwick, and Wingfield.

Constituency profile
The Amber Valley constituency is located in the east of Derbyshire, and covers the market and manufacturing towns of Alfreton, Heanor and Ripley; in a majority of council elections from 1960 to 2012, these were favourably disposed to the Labour Party. The constituency also contains many rural and suburban wards, which during the same period generally had a majority in support of the Conservatives. The constituency stretches from the edge of the Peak District to the northern edge of Derby, which forms another set of neighbourhoods more favourably disposed to the Conservatives.

Since 2000 the Conservatives have controlled Amber Valley Borough Council with the exception of a year from 2014 to 2015 and from 2019 to 2021 when Labour were in power. Prior to this, the council was held by Labour or under no overall control for all but three years from its formation in 1973.

The constituency's generally small majorities and bellwether status since 1983 (being won by the party that nationally holds the most parliamentary seats) means Amber Valley was, by most common measures, a marginal seat. However, the large Conservative majorities in 2017 and 2019 would seem to indicate this is no longer the case.

Members of Parliament

Elections

Elections in the 2010s

Going into the 2015 general election, this was the 24th most marginal constituency in Great Britain, Labour requiring a swing from the Conservatives of 0.6% to take the seat (based on the result of the 2010 general election).

Elections in the 2000s

Elections in the 1990s

Elections in the 1980s

See also
List of parliamentary constituencies in Derbyshire
Opinion polling for the next United Kingdom general election in individual constituencies

Notes

References

Parliamentary constituencies in Derbyshire
Constituencies of the Parliament of the United Kingdom established in 1983